K1-2 is a planetary nebula in the constellation Pyxis. It was discovered by Czech astronomer Luboš Kohoutek in 1961. The central star of the nebula—VW Pyxidis—is a post-common-envelope binary composed of a hot degenerate star and a cooler companion in a close orbit. A best-fit calculation from its orbit and spectra yields a white dwarf-like star with around 50% of the Sun's mass and a main sequence lie star around 70% as massive as the Sun. Jets of matter are emanating from the system. One study yielded a surface temperature of 85,000 K for the hotter star.

References

Planetary nebulae
Pyxis (constellation)